Caesar Rodney High School is a public high school located in Camden, Delaware, just south of Dover. The school is in Caesar Rodney School District. Its enrollment is over 2,000. During 1983 to 1984, Caesar Rodney was recognized as a Blue Ribbon School by the US Department of Education.

In addition to Camden,  other communities served by the Caesar Rodney district include Highland Acres, Kent Acres,  Magnolia, Rising Sun-Lebanon, Rodney Village, Woodside, Wyoming, most of Woodside East,  a small portion of Riverview, and the southern part of the state capital, Dover. The Dover Air Force Base also lies within the district.

Notable alumni

Ashley Coleman (1999) - won Miss Teen Delaware and later won Miss Teen USA 1999; became the first delegate from Delaware to win national title
Duron Harmon (2009) - free safety for the Atlanta Falcons football team
Natalie Morales (1990) NBC News journalist and coanchor of the today show
Laron Profit - former NBA basketball player for the Washington Wizards and Los Angeles Lakers
Ian Snell - former MLB pitcher for Seattle Mariners and Pittsburgh Pirates
Dave Williams - MLB player (Pittsburgh Pirates, Cincinnati Reds, New York Mets)

References

External links
 

High schools in Kent County, Delaware
Public high schools in Delaware
1967 establishments in Delaware
Educational institutions established in 1967